Quzluy-e Olya (also Romanized as Qūzlūy-e ‘Olyā; also known as Kozlu-giaria, Qowzlū-ye Bālā, Qowzlū-ye ‘Olyā, Qozlū, and Qūzlū) is a village in Kani Bazar Rural District, Khalifan District, Mahabad County, West Azerbaijan Province, Iran. At the 2006 census, its population was 402, in 68 families.

References 

Populated places in Mahabad County